Arescoptera is a monotypic snout moth genus described by Alfred Jefferis Turner in 1911. It contains the single species, Arescoptera idiotypa, described in the same article. It is found in Australia, including New South Wales.

References

Pyralini
Monotypic moth genera
Moths described in 1911
Moths of Australia
Pyralidae genera